The Music Critics Association of North America gives an Award for Best New Opera annually to given to a composer and librettist.

In giving the inaugural award in 2017, the association stated that the prize "which recognizes musical and theatrical excellence, will be given annually to a fully staged work that received its world premiere in the preceding calendar year."

Recipients

References

External links

American music awards
Classical music awards
Awards established in 2017
Opera-related lists